Koit (Estonian for dawn) or KOIT may refer to:

 KOIT, a radio station (96.5 FM) licensed to San Francisco, California, US
 Koit (name), an Estonian masculine given name
 "Koit" (song), by Tõnis Mägi
 Koit (star) or XO-4, a star in the Lynx constellation
 Koit, a character, for which the star is named, from a folk tale by Friedrich Robert Faehlmann

See also
 Coit (disambiguation)
 Koito (disambiguation)
 Quoit (disambiguation)